The following is a list of mountains in Korea:

List of mountains in North Korea

Pyeongyang
 Taesongsan (대성산) –

Chagang Province
 Namsan (남산) – 
 Obongsan (오봉산) –

North Pyongan Province
 Myohyangsan (묘향산) –

South Hwanghae Province
 Kuwolsan (구월산) – 
 Maebongsan (매봉산) – 
 Namsan (남산) – 
 Namsan (남산) –

Kangwon Province
 Kumgangsan (금강산) –  
 Maebongsan (매봉산) – 
 Obongsan (오봉산) –

South Hamgyong Province
 Madaesan (마대산) – 
 Obongsan (오봉산) – 
 Buksubaeksan (북수백산)  – , the third tallest mountain in the entire Korea.

North Hamgyong Province
 Chilbosan (칠보산) – 
 Mantapsan (만탑산) – 
 Gwanmobong (관모봉) – , the second tallest mountain in the enitre Korea.

Ryanggang Province
 Paektusan (백두산) – , the tallest mountain in North Korea and the Korean Peninsula altogether.
 Chailbong (차일봉) – , the 4th tallest mountain in the entire Korea.

List of mountains in South Korea

Seoul

 Achasan (아차산;) – 
 Ansan (Seoul) (안산;) -  
 Bukhansan (북한산) –  
 Buramsan (불암산) –  
 Cheonggyesan (청계산) –  
 Dobongsan (도봉산) –  
 Eungbongsan (응봉산) – 
 Gwanaksan (관악산) –  
 Inwangsan (인왕산) –  
 Namsan (남산) – 
 Samseongsan (삼성산) – 
 Suraksan (수락산) –  
 Yongmabong (용마봉) –

Busan
 Geumjeongsan (금정산) –  
 Jangsan (장산) – 
 Seunghaksan (승학산) – 496 meters (1627 ft)

Daegu
 Choejeongsan (최정산) –  
 Gasan (가산) –  
 Palgongsan (팔공산;八公山) , not to be confused with mountain of Jeollabukdo with same name.

Incheon
 Goryeosan (고려산) –  
 Gyeyangsan (계양산;) – 
 Haemyeongsan (해명산) –  
 Horyonggoksan (호룡곡산) –  
 Manisan (마니산) –  
 Nakgasan (낙가산) –  
 Sangbongsan (상봉산) –

Gwangju
 Mudeungsan (무등산) –

Daejeon
 Gyejoksan (계족산) – 
 Gyeryongsan (계룡산) –  
 Jangtaesan (장태산) – 
 Sikjangsan (식장산) –

Ulsan
 Baekunsan (백운산) – 
 Cheonhwangsan (천황산) –  
 Daeunsan (대운산) – .
 Dongdaesan (동대산) – 
 Gajisan (가지산) –  
 Ganwolsan (간월산) –  
 Goheonsan (고헌산) –  
 Hamwolsan (함월산) – 
 Hwajangsan(화장산) – 
 Jaeyaksan (재약산) –  
 Munsusan (문수산) – 
 Muryongsan (무룡산) –  
 Namamsan (남암산) – 
 Sinbulsan (신불산) –  
 Yeomposan (염포산) – 
 Yeongchuksan (영축산) – 
 Yeonhwasan (연화산) –

Gyeonggi Province
 Baegunbong (백운봉) –  
 Baegunsan (백운산) –  
 Baegunsan (백운산) – 
 Baekdunbong (백둔봉) –  
 Bakdalbong (박달봉) –  
 Bukhansan (북한산) –  
 Bulgisan (불기산) –  
 Bulgoksan (불곡산) –  
 Bulgoksan (불곡산) – 
 Buramsan (불암산) –  
 Cheonbosan (천보산) – 
 Cheonggyesan (청계산) –  
 Cheonggyesan (청계산) –  
 Cheonggyesan (청계산) –  
 Cheongwusan (청우산) –  
 Cheonmasan (천마산) –  
 Chilbosan (칠보산) – 
 Chokdaebong (촉대봉) –  
 Chungnyungsan (축령산) –  
 Daegeumsan (대금산) –  
 Danwolbong (단월봉) –  
 Dobongsan (도봉산) –  
 Dodeuramsan (도드람산; 도드람山) –  
 Doilbong (도일봉) –  
 Eobisan (어비산) –  
 Gadeoksan (가덕산) –  
 Gakkeulsan (각흘산) –  
 Galgisan (갈기산) – 
 Gamaksan (감악산) –  
 Gangssibong (강씨봉) –  
 Garisan (가리산) –  
 Geomdansan (검단산) –  
 Geomdansan (검단산) – 
 Geumjusan (금주산) –  
 Geummulsan (금물산) –  
 Godaesan (고대산) –  
 Godongsan (고동산) –  
 Gokdalsan (곡달산) –  
 Goraesan (고래산; 고래山) –  
 Gunamusan (구나무산; 구나무山) –  
 Gungmangbong (국망봉) –  
 Gwanaksan (관악산) –  
 Gwaneumsan (관음산) –  
 Gwangdeoksan (광덕산) –  
 Gwanggyosan (광교산) –  
 Gwimokbong (귀목봉) –   
 Gyegwansan (계관산) –  
 Hamwangbong (함왕봉) –  
 Homyeongsan (호명산) –  
 Hwaaksan (화악산) –  
 Hwayasan (화야산) –  
 Jijangbong (지장봉) –  
 Jongjasan (종자산) –  
 Jugeumsan (주금산) –  
 Jungwonsan (중원산) –  
 Mindungsan (민둥산; 민둥山) – 
 Myeongjisan (명지산) –  
 Myeongseongsan (명성산) –  
 Namhansan (남한산) – 
 Samseongsan (삼성산) – 
 Sanghaebong (상해봉) –  
 Sangsan (상산) –  
 Seongjisan (성지산) –  
 Seongnyongsan (석룡산) –  
 Seounsan (서운산) –  
 Sorisan (소리산) –  
 Soyosan (소요산) –  
 Sudeoksan (수덕산) –  
 Suraksan (수락산) –  
 Taehwasan (태화산) –  
 Udusan (우두산) –  
 Unaksan (운악산) –  
 Ungilsan (운길산) –  
 Wangbangsan (왕방산) –  
 Yebongsan (예봉산) –  
 Yeoninsan (연인산) –  
 Yongmunsan (용문산) –  
 Yumyeongsan (유명산) –

Gangwon Province
 Amisan (아미산) –  
 Ansan (Gangwon) (안산) –  
 Baegamsan (백암산) –  
 Baegusan (백우산) –  
 Baegunsan (백운산) –  
 Baegunsan (백운산) –   
 Baegunsan (백운산) –  
 Baekbyeongsan (백병산) –  
 Baekdeoksan (백덕산) –  
 Baekseoksan (백석산) –  
 Bakjisan (박지산) –  
 Balgyosan (발교산) –  
 Balwangsan (발왕산) –  
 Banamsan (반암산) –  
 Bangtaesan (방태산) –  
 Bawisan (바위산; None) –  
 Bokgyesan (복계산) –  
 Bokjusan (복주산) –  
 Bongboksan (봉복산) –  
 Bonghwasan (봉화산) –  
 Boraebong (보래봉) –  
 Buyongsan (부용산) –  
 Cheongoksan (청옥산) –  
 Cheongoksan (청옥산) –  
 Cheonjibong (천지봉) –  
 Chiaksan (치악산) –  
 Chokdaebong (촉대봉) –   
 Daeamsan (대암산) –  
 Daebawisan (대바위산; --) –  
 Daedeoksan (대덕산) –  
 Daemisan (대미산) –  
 Daeseongsan (대성산) –  
 Dalgibong (닭이봉) –  
 Daraksan (다락산) –  
 Deokgasan (덕가산) –  
 Deokgosan (덕고산) –  
 Deokhangsan (덕항산) –  
 Deoksusan (덕수산) –  
 Dongdaesan (동대산) –  
 Durobong (두로봉) –  
 Duryusan (두류산) –  
 Dutasan (두타산) –  
 Duwibong (두위봉) –  
 Eodapsan (어답산) –  
 Eungbongsan (응봉산) –  
 Eungbongsan (응봉산) –  
 Eungbongsan (응봉산) –  
 Eungbongsan (응봉산) –  
 Eungbongsan (응봉산) –  
 Gachilbong (가칠봉) –  
 Gachilbong (가칠봉) – 
 Gadeoksan (가덕산) –   
 Gadeukbong (가득봉) –  
 Gaeinsan (개인산) –  
 Gakkeulsan (각흘산) –   
 Gamabong (가마봉) –  
 Gamaksan (감악산) –  
 Garibong (가리봉) –  
 Garisan (가리산) –  
 Gariwangsan (가리왕산) –  
 Geombongsan (검봉산) –  
 Geomunsan (거문산) –  
 Geumdaebong (금대봉) –  
 Geumdangsan (금당산) –  
 Geumhaksan (금학산) –  
 Geummulsan (금물산) –  
 Geunsan (근산) –  
 Godaesan (고대산) –   
 Gogosan (고고산) –  
 Gojeoksan (고적산) –  
 Gombong (곰봉) –  
 Gongjaksan (공작산) –  
 Gorupogisan (고루포기산; None) –  
 Gubongdaesan (구봉대산) –  
 Guhaksan (구학산) –  
 Gwaebangsan (괘방산) –  
 Gwangdeoksan (광덕산) –  
 Gwittaegibong (귀때기청봉; None) –  
 Gyebangsan (계방산) –  
 Gyegwansan (계관산) –  
 Gyejoksan (계족산) –  
 Hambaeksan (함백산) –  
 Heungjeongsan (흥정산) –  
 Horyeongbong (호령봉) –  
 Hwaaksan (화악산) –  
 Hwangbyeongsan (황병산) –  
 Hwangcheolbong (황철봉) –  
 Hoemokbong (회목봉) –  
 Hoeryeongbong (회령봉) –  
 Jamdusan (잠두산) –  
 Janggunbawisan (장군바위산; None) –  
 Jangmisan (장미산) –  
 Jangsan (장산) –  
 Jatbong (잣봉; None) –  
 Jeombongsan (점봉산) –  
 Jewangsan (제왕산) –  
 Jungwangsan (중왕산) –  
 Madaesan (마대산) –  
 Maebongsan (매봉산) –  
 Maebongsan (매봉산) –  
 Maebongsan (매봉산) –  
 Maebongsan (매봉산) –  
 Maehwasan (매화산) –  
 Maenghyeonbong (맹현봉) –  
 Majeoksan (마적산) –  
 Mangyeongdaesan (망경대산) –  
 Masan (마산) –  
 Mindungsan (민둥산; None) –  
 Mireuksan (미륵산) –  
 Mogusan (목우산) –  
 Munsubong (문수봉) –  
 Myeongbongsan (명봉산) –  
 Myeonsan (면산) –  
 Nambyeongsan (남병산) –  
 Namdaebong (남대봉) –  
 Neunggyeongbong (능경봉) –  
 Nochusan (노추산) –  
 Noinbong (노인봉) –  
 Obongsan (오봉산) –  
 Obongsan (오봉산) – 
 Odaesan (오대산) –  
 Oeumsan (오음산) –  
 Palbongsan (팔봉산) –  
 Sajasan (사자산) –  
 Samaksan (삼악산) –  
 Sambangsan (삼방산) –  
 Samyeongsan (사명산) –  
 Sangjeongbawisan (상정바위산; None) –  
 Sangwonsan (상원산) –  
 Seogiamsan (석이암산) –  
 Seokbyeongsan (석병산) –  
 Seonbawisan (선바위산; None) –  
 Seondalsan (선달산) –  
 Seongjisan (성지산) –  
 Seongnyongsan (석룡산) –  
 Seonjaryeong (선자령) –  
 Seoraksan (설악산) – , third tallest mountain in South Korea, second tallest mountain in mainland South Korea.
 Seungdusan (승두산) –  
 Sinseonbong (신선봉) –  
 Sipjabong (십자봉) –  
 Sogyebangsan (소계방산) –  
 Soppulsan (소뿔산; None) –  
 Taebaeksan (태백산) –  
 Taegisan (태기산) –  
 Taehwasan (태화산) –  
 Ungyosan (운교산) –  
 Unmusan (운무산) –  
 Wantaeksan (완택산) –  
 Yaksusan (약수산) –  
 Yeonyeopsan (연엽산) –  
 Yonghwasan (용화산) –  
 Yukbaeksan (육백산) –

North Chungcheong Province

 Akwibong (악휘봉) –  
 Baegaksan (백악산) –  
 Baegunsan (백운산) – 
 Baekhwasan (백화산) –  
 Baekhwasan (백화산) –  
 Bakdalsan (박달산) –  
 Bakjwibong (박쥐봉; None) –  
 Boryeonsan (보련산) –  
 Bubong (부봉) –  
 Bukbawisan (북바위산; -) –  
 Cheondeungsan (천등산) –  
 Cheonghwasan (청화산) –  
 Cheontaesan (천태산) –  
 Chilbosan (칠보산) –  
 Daemisan (대미산) –  
 Daeseongsan (대성산) –  
 Daeyasan (대야산) –  
 Deokgasan (덕가산) –  
 Domyeongsan (도명산) –  
 Dongsan (동산) –  
 Doraksan (도락산) –  
 Dosolbong (도솔봉) –  
 Eoraesan (어래산) –  
 Gaeunsan (가은산) –  
 Gaseopsan (가섭산) – 
 Gakhosan (각호산) –  
 Galgisan (갈기산) –  
 Gamaksan (감악산) –  
 Geumsusan (금수산) –  
 Gubyeongsan (구병산) –  
 Gudambong (구담봉) –  
 Guhaksan (구학산) –  
 Gungmangbong (국망봉) –  
 Gunjasan (군자산) –  
 Guwangbong (구왕봉) –  
 Gyemyeongsan (계명산) – 
 Haseolsan (하설산) –  
 Heiyangsan (희양산) –  
 Hwangaksan (황악산) –  
 Hwangjeongsan (황정산) –  
 Hyeongjebong (형제봉) –  
 Imanbong (이만봉) –  
 Indeungsan (인등산) –  
 Jakseongsan (작성산) –  
 Jangseongbong (장성봉) –  
 Jebibong (제비봉) –  
 Johangsan (조항산) –  
 Joryeongsan (조령산) –  
 Jukyeopsan (죽엽산) –  
 Jungdaebong (중대봉) –  
 Makjangbong (막장봉) –  
 Mangdeokbong (망덕봉) –  
 Manisan (마니산) – 
 Mansubong (만수봉) –  
 Minjujisan (민주지산) –  
 Munsubong (문수봉) –  
 Nagyeongsan (낙영산) –  
 Namgunjasan (남군자산) –  
 Oksunbong (옥순봉) –  
 Poamsan (포암산) –  
 Poseongbong (포성봉) –  
 Sambongsan (삼봉산) –  
 Samdobong (삼도봉) –  
 Seounsan (서운산) – 
 Sinseonbong (신선봉) –  
 Sinseonbong (신선봉) –  
 Sipjabong (십자봉) –  
 Sobaeksan (소백산) –  
 Songnisan (속리산) –  
 Suribong (수리봉) –  
 Suribong (수리봉) –  
 Taehwasan (태화산) –  
 Uamsan (우암산) – 
 Woraksan (월악산) –

South Chungcheong Province

 Amisan (아미산) –  
 Barangsan (바랑산; None) –  
 Baekhwasan (백화산) – 
 Cheontaesan (천태산) –  
 Chilbongsan (칠봉산) –  
 Chilgapsan (칠갑산) –  
 Daedunsan (대둔산) –  
 Deoksungsan (덕숭산) –  
 Gayasan (가야산) –  
 Gobulsan (고불산) –  
 Gwangdeoksan (광덕산) –  
 Gyeryongsan (계룡산) –  
 Heukseongsan (흑성산) – 
 Illaksan (일락산) –  
 Jinaksan (진악산) –  
 Mansusan (만수산) –  
 Museongsan (무성산) –  
 Obongsan (오봉산) – 
 Oseosan (오서산) –  
 Palbongsan (팔봉산) – 
 Seodaesan (서대산) –  
 Taehwasan (태화산) –  
 Wolseongbong (월성봉) –  
 Yongbongsan (용봉산) –

North Jeolla Province

 Baegambong (백암봉) –  
 Baegunsan (백운산) –  
 Bangjangsan (방장산) –  
 Bangmunsan (방문산) –  
 Banyabong (반야봉) –  
 Baraebong (바래봉; None) –  
 Bonghwasan (봉화산) –  
 Bugwisan (부귀산) –  
 Byeonsan (변산) –  
 Cheondeungsan (천등산) –  
 Chilbosan (칠보산) – 
 Chuwolsan (추월산) –  
 Daedeoksan (대덕산) –  
 Deogyusan (덕유산) –  
 Deoktaesan (덕태산) –  
 Gangcheonsan (강천산) –  
 Gubongsan (구봉산) –  
 Hambaeksan (함백산) –  
 Hoemunsan (회문산) – 
 Jangansan (장안산) –  
 Jeoksangsan (적상산) –  
 Maisan (마이산) –  
 Manbokdae (만복대) –  
 Manhaengsan (만행산) –  
 Minjujisan (민주지산) –  
 Mireuksan (미륵산) – 
 Moaksan (모악산) –  
 Mundeokbong (문덕봉) –  
 Muryongsan (무룡산) –  
 Naebyeonsan (내변산) –  
 Naejangsan (내장산) –  
 Namdeogyusan (남덕유산) –  
 Obongsan (오봉산) – 
 Palgongsan (팔공산) –   Not to be confused with mountain in Daegu of the same name.
 Samdobong (삼도봉) –  
 Seongaksan (선각산) –  
 Seongsusan (성수산) –  
 Seonunsan (선운산) –  
 Unjangsan (운장산) –  
 Yeonseoksan (연석산) –

South Jeolla Province
 Baegambong (백암봉) –  
 Baegunsan (백운산) –  
 Baekamsan (백암산) –  
 Bangjangsan (방장산) –  
 Bangmunsan (방문산) –   
 Banyabong (반야봉) –  
 Bulgapsan (불갑산) –  
 Byeongpungsan (병풍산) –  
 Cheondeungsan (천등산) –  
 Cheongwansan (천관산) –  
 Chuwolsan (추월산) –  
 Dalmasan (달마산) –  
 Deokyusan (덕유산) –  
 Dongaksan (동악산) –  
 Dosolbong (도솔봉) –  
 Duryunsan (두륜산) –  
 Heukseoksan (흑석산) –  
 Gajisan (가지산) –  
 Gangcheonsan (강천산) –  
 Geumjeonsan (금전산) –  
 Geumosan (금오산) –  
 Gitdaebong (깃대봉; None) –  
 Goribong (고리봉;--) –  
 Illimsan (일림산) –  
 Imamsan (임암산) –  
 Jeamsan (제암산) –  
 Jeokjasan (적자산) –  
 Jirisan (지리산) – , the second-tallest mountain in South Korea and the tallest mountain in mainland South Korea.
 Jogyesan (조계산) –  
 Jujaksan (주작산) –  
 Manbokdae (만복대) – 
 Mandeoksan (만덕산) –  
 Mohusan (모후산) –  
 Mudeungsan (무등산) –  
 Muryongsan (무룡산) –   
 Nogodan (노고단) –  
 Obongsan (오봉산) – 
 Obongsan (오봉산) – 
 Palyeongsan (팔영산) –  
 Sajasan (사자산) –  
 Sambongsan (삼봉산) –  
 Samjeongsan (삼정산) –  
 Sanghwangbong (상황봉) –  
 Sanseongsan (산성산) –  
 Suinsan (수인산) –  
 Suwolsan (수월산) –  
 Wangsirubong (왕시루봉; None) –  
 Wolchulsan (월출산) –  
 Yeongchwisan (영취산) –

North Gyeongsang Province

 Baegaksan (백악산) –   
 Baegamsan (백암산) –  
 Baekhwasan (백화산) –  
 Baekhwasan (백화산) –  
 Biseulsan (비슬산) –  
 Bohyeonsan (보현산) – 
 Bonghwangsan (봉황산) –  
 Bubong (부봉) –  
 Cheondeungsan (천등산) –  
 Cheongnyangsan (청량산) –  
 Cheongoksan (청옥산) –  
 Cheonjusan (천주산) –  
 Chilbongsan (칠봉산) –  
 Chilbosan (칠보산) – 
 Chunghwasan (청화산) –  
 Daedeoksan (대덕산) –  
 Daemisan (대미산) –  
 Daeyasan (대야산) –  
 Danseoksan (단석산) –  
 Dojangsan (도장산) –  
 Dongyongsan (독용산) –  
 Dosolbong (도솔봉) –   
 Dundeoksan (둔덕산) –  
 Eungbongsan (응봉산) –  
 Gajisan (가지산) –  
 Gakhwasan (각화산) –  
 Gapjangsan (갑장산) – 
 Gasan (가산) –  
 Gayasan (가야산) –  
 Geommasan (검마산) –  
 Geumosan (금오산) –  
 Goheonsan (고헌산) –  
 Gonddeoksan (공덕산) –  
 Guksabong (국사봉) –  
 Guryongsan (구룡산) –  
 Guwangbong (구왕봉) –  
 Gyeonggaksan (경각산) –  
 Heiyangsan (희양산) –  
 Hwangaksan (황악산) –  
 Hwanghaksan (황학산) – 
 Hwangjangsan (황장산) –  
 Hyeongjebong (형제봉) –  
 Imanbong (이만봉) –  
 Ilwolsan (일월산) –  
 Jangseongbong (장성봉) – 
 Jeoksangsan (적상산) –  
 Joryeongsan (조령산) –  
 Juheulsan (주흘산) –  
 Juwangsan (주왕산) –  
 Mireuksan (미륵산) – 
 Munboksan (문복산) – 
 Munsubong (문수봉) –  
 Munsubong (문수봉) –  
 Munsusan (문수산) –  
 Myeonsan (면산) –   
 Naeyeonsan (내연산) –  
 Namsan (남산) –  
 Namsan (남산) – 
 Noeumsan (노음산) –  
 Noejeongsan (뇌정산) –  
 Obongsan (오봉산) – 
 Obongsan (오봉산) – 
 Palgaksan (팔각산) –  
 Palgongsan (팔공산) –  
 Poamsan (포암산) –   
 Poseongbong (포성봉) –  
 Samdobong (삼도봉) –  
 Seondalsan (선달산) –  
 Seonginbong (성인봉) –  
 Sobaeksan (소백산) –  
 Songnisan (속리산) –  
 Sudosan (수도산) – 
 Taebaeksan (태백산) –  
 Tohamsan (토함산) –  
 Tongosan (통고산) –  
 Undalsan (운달산) –  
 Unmunsan (운문산) –  
 Wangdusan (왕두산) –  
 Yeonyeopsan (연엽산) –

South Gyeongsang Province
 Baegunsan (백운산) –  
 Bigyesan (비계산) – 
 Bongdaesan (봉대산) – 
 Bulmosan (불모산) – 
 Byeokbangsan (벽방산) – 
 Byeolyusan (별유산) – 
 Cheonhwangsan (천황산) –  
 Cheonseongsan (천성산) – 
 Cheontaesan (천태산) – 
 Chilhyeonsan (칠현산) – 
 Daeseongsan (대성산) –  
 Danjibong (단지봉) – 
 Eungbongsan (응봉산) –  
 Gajisan (가지산) –  
 Garasan (가라산) –  
 Gayasan (가야산) –  
 Geomangsan (거망산) –  
 Geumjeongsan (금정산) –  
 Geumsan (금산) –  
 Geumosan (금오산) –  
 Geumwonsan (금원산) –  
 Gibaeksan (기백산) –  
 Gwaegwansan (괘관산) –  
 Gwaebangsan (괘방산) – 
 Gwannyongsan (관룡산) –  
 Gyebangsan (계방산) – 
 Gyeryongsan (계룡산) – 
 Hogusan (호구산) –  
 Hwamaesan (황매산) –  
 Hwangmaesan (황매산) –  
 Hwangseoksan (황석산) –  
 Hwawangsan (화왕산) –  
 Hyangnosan (향로산) – 
 Jaeyaksan (재약산) –  
 Jagulsan (자굴산) –  
 Jarimangsan (자리망산) –  
 Jirisan (지리산) –  
 Jirisan (지리산) –  
 Mangsan (망산; None) –  
 Minyeobong (미녀봉) –  
 Mireuksan (미륵산) –  
 Muhaksan (무학산) –  
 Namdeogyusan (남덕유산) –  
 Nojasan (노자산) –  
 Obongsan (오봉산) – 
 Obongsan (오봉산) – 
 Sambongsan (삼봉산) –  
 Sambongsan (삼봉산) –  
 Samjeongsan (삼정산) –  
 Samsinbong (삼신봉) –  
 Seobuksan (서북산) –  
 Seolheulsan (설흘산) –  
 Seongjesan (성제봉) –  
 Sinbulsan (신불산) –  
 Ungseokbong (웅석봉) – 
 Unmunsan (운문산) –  
 Waryongsan (와룡산) –  
 Wolbongsan (월봉산) –  
 Wonhyosan (원효산) –  
 Worasan (월아산) –  
 Wudusan (우두산) –  
 Yanggaksan (양각산) –  
 Yeohangsan (여항산) –  
 Yeongchuksan (영축산) – 
 Yeongsinbong (영신봉) –  
 Yeonhwasan (연화산) –

Jeju Province
 Hallasan (한라산) – , the tallest mountain in South Korea.

View

See also

 Geography of Korea, North Korea, and South Korea
 List of mountains in Seoul
 Baekdudaegan
 Five Mountains of Korea, five famous mountains in Korean history and culture
 Korean Peninsula

Notes

References

External links

Korea
Mountains
Korea